Eustis Fremont Longfellow (April 28, 1887 – October 15, 1959) was a Canadian professional ice hockey player. He played with the Toronto Tecumsehs of the National Hockey Association. He died in October 1959 while hunting near Sundridge, Ontario.

References

External links
Ed Longfellow at JustSportsStats

1887 births
1959 deaths
Canadian ice hockey forwards
Ice hockey people from Quebec
Sportspeople from Sherbrooke
Toronto Tecumsehs players